Vyacheslav Nikolaevich Gorpishin (born January 20, 1970) is a Russian team handball player and Olympic champion from 2000 in Sydney.  He received a bronze medal at the 2004 Summer Olympics in Athens with the Russian national team.

He was a squad member on the Unified Team that won a gold medal at the 1992 Summer Olympics in Barcelona. But he did not play in a single match and did not receive a medal.

References
 profile

1970 births
Living people
Russian male handball players
Olympic handball players of Russia
Handball players at the 1996 Summer Olympics
Handball players at the 2000 Summer Olympics
Handball players at the 2004 Summer Olympics
Olympic gold medalists for Russia
Olympic bronze medalists for Russia
Sportspeople from Chișinău
Olympic medalists in handball
Medalists at the 2004 Summer Olympics
Medalists at the 2000 Summer Olympics